Karimpur Pannadevi College, established in 1968, is a general degree college at Karimpur town in Nadia district, India. It offers undergraduate courses in arts, commerce and sciences. It is affiliated to  University of Kalyani.

History 
The college established with the aim to cater higher education to the people of the locality, particularly the poor and middle class ones, who cannot afford to go far of places for learning. Dr. Nalinaksha Sanyal, a Bengali scholar and nationalist politician was the key person for the establishment of that college. One businessman Durga Prasad Agarwala, made donation and the college was named after his wife Pannadevi Agarwala.

Departments

Science

Chemistry
Physics
Mathematics
Botany
Zoology
Physiology         
Micro Biology

Arts and Commerce

Bengali
English
Sanskrit
History
Geography
Political Science
Philosophy
Economics
Commerce
Education
Film maker

Accreditation
The college is recognized by the University Grants Commission (UGC).

See also

References

External links
Karimpur Pannadevi College
University of Kalyani
University Grants Commission
National Assessment and Accreditation Council
 

Universities and colleges in Nadia district
Colleges affiliated to University of Kalyani
Educational institutions established in 1968
1968 establishments in West Bengal